Sully is a surname, and may refer to:

 Alfred Sully (1820–1879), American Civil War and Indian Wars officer and actor
 Anthony Sully (born 1944), American serial killer
 Brian Sully (1936–2019), Australian judge law professor
 Damien Sully (born 1974), Australian rules football field umpire
 Daniel Sully (1855–1910), American circus performer, stage actor and playwright
 David John Sully (born 1947), Welsh chess player
 Eugene Sully (born 1977), runner-up in Big Brother Series 6, UK
 François Sully (1927/28–1971), French journalist and photographer
 Frank Sully (1908–1975), American film actor
 Haydn Sully (1939–2006), English cricketer
 Henry Sully (1680–1729), English clockmaker
 Ivory Sully (born 1957), American football player
 Jack Sully (c.1850–1904), American cattle rustler, outlaw and sheriff born Arthur McDonald
 James Sully (1842–1923), English psychologist
 Jeanne Sully (1905–1995), French actress
 John Sully (c.1283–c.1388), English knight
 Kathleen Sully (1910–2001), English novelist
 Margaretta Sully West (d. 1810), American theater manager and stage actor
 Mariette Sully (1878–1950), Belgian soprano
 Mary Sully (1896–1963), Yankton Dakota avant-garde artist
 Robert Matthew Sully (1803–1855), American portrait painter
 Rosalie Sully (1818–1847), American painter 
 Royston Sully (born 1985), English cricketer
 Sandra Sully (born c. 1962), Australian journalist
 Sandra Sully (songwriter) (fl. 2006), member of The Love Machine and songwriter
 Siergot Sully (born 1951), Haitian boxer
 Thomas Sully (1783–1872), English-born American painter
 Walter Sully (1895–1970), Australian cinematographer and newsreel cameraman

See also
 Sully Sullenberger (born 1951), American pilot